"Holding a Black Lives Matter Sign in America's Most Racist Town" is a YouTube video by American filmmaker Rob Bliss, published on July 27, 2020. The video consists of Bliss holding a sign reading "Black Lives Matter" in Harrison, Arkansas, a town that has been dubbed "America's Most Racist Town" due to its connections to white pride riots and the headquarters of the white supremacist terrorist hate group the Ku Klux Klan. During the video, multiple white passersby drive by and shout racist obscenities. As of May 2022, the video has over 11 million views on YouTube.

"Holding a Black Lives Matter Sign in America's Most Racist Town" was filmed from July 9 to 11 in Harrison using a GoPro. The video's release was notable for being amongst protests in the wake of the murder of George Floyd at the hands of Minneapolis police officer Derek Chauvin.

"Holding a Black Lives Matter Sign in America's Most Racist Town" also received criticism from Harrison officials, including statements from mayor Jerry Jackson.

Background 
Prior to "Holding a Black Lives Matter Sign in America's Most Racist Town", Bliss' previous videos were notable for touching on other social issues, including 2014's "10 Hours of Walking in NYC as a Woman", a video where actress Shoshana Roberts walks for ten hours through all areas of Manhattan compiling the frequent catcalling that she experienced. The video spawned numerous parodies, including a Funny or Die satire where the woman is replaced with a man, and another where the woman is replaced with North Korean Supreme Leader Kim Jong-Un. The video also inspired numerous serious variations, including one where the woman in question is wearing a hijab.

Bliss also organized a stunt where 100 men were promised to go on a Tinder date with a woman, only to be led to a crowded club populated by the other men. In order to date the woman, the men had to compete in a Hunger Games-esque competition.

Filming 
"Holding a Black Lives Matter Sign in America's Most Racist Town" was filmed over the course of three days using a GoPro camera strapped to Bliss' chest, which meant that a hole had to be cut through his T-shirt for the camera to be able to film Bliss' interactions. On why Bliss decided to film in Harrison, he told The Washington Post that "(I) felt like many of the protests were “preaching to the choir. These conversations should probably be happening in places where you wouldn’t expect them if you really want to take that leap and get people to better understand you’re fighting for."

On average, Bliss states that he spent around eight hours per day holding the sign around Harrison. July 9, his first day, was spent on a busy intersection. July 10 and 11, his second and third days filming, were spent outside of a Walmart supercenter.

The entirety of the video features real-time captions in the same font as Bliss' previous viral video "10 Hours of Walking in NYC as a Woman".

Content 

The video features Bliss holding a sign that reads "Black Lives Matter" in various locations, including on various roadsides and in front of a Walmart supercenter. Passersby stop by and make various statements, including "White Lives Matter", "All Lives Matter", the n-word, Anti-Semitic pejoratives, and "Are you a Marxist?" One woman states that "(black lives) don't fucking matter", justifying it by saying "I have black friends". 

A man in a cream-colored Camry drives past Bliss and physically threatens him, stating, “About 10 minutes, I’m gonna be back. You better be fucking gone.” Multiple passerby make comparisons to Black Lives Matter as "the biggest hoax there ever was" and "the next thing to ISIS." Near the end of the video, Bliss is kicked out of the aforementioned Walmart supercenter despite citing a recently implemented Walmart policy working to prevent racism in its stores.

At the very end of the video, Bliss receives a note written on a napkin. The note reads: "Ignore the haters [you're] being peaceful what [you're] doing is good just a friendly reminder Don't give up hope". Pajiba commented that "there’s a nice moment in the last 10 seconds of the video that reminds me that, for every hick town like Harrison, Arkansas, there’s an ashamed teenager dying to get out. I hope you do, kiddo."

Reception 
"Holding a Black Lives Matter Sign in America's Most Racist Town" has over 11 million views on YouTube as of June 2022. 

Near the end of the video, Bliss is kicked out of a Walmart despite explaining to the manager ("Mike") that a recently implemented Walmart policy is working to prevent racial discrimination in its stores. In a statement to USA Today, Walmart stated, “As a company committed to racial equity, we stand in solidarity with the Black community, and are appalled some chose to express themselves in such a hurtful way."

Response from Harrison officials 
Harrison, Arkansas, the titular "America's Most Racist Town", has a notorious reputation for racism. This is due to various reasons, including multiple race riots in the 20th century as well as Harrison being the headquarters for the white supremacist terrorist organization the Ku Klux Klan. 

Kevin Cheri, member of the Harrison Community Task Force on Race Relations, said that the video "unfairly maligned" Harrison, and that they are working to fight racism in their community. Cheri commented, "Is there racism in Harrison? Sure, there's some, but no more – and a lot less – than a lot of other places in the United States."

Jerry Jackson 
Jerry Jackson, the mayor of Harrison, gave a statement on the video in a press release on July 28, 2020, the day after the video's release. Jackson stated: "The video does not represent Boone County nor the City of Harrison. While we cannot excuse the reprehensible behavior and words of individuals recorded in the video, we know for certain that they do not reflect the views of the majority of the good people of our communities. It is obvious there is still work to be done in our area and across the nation. We must constantly strive to do better, and we pledge our continued efforts in that regard." Jackson also stated that the video "unfairly represented Harrison and eroded decades of work to overcome our past racist reputation."

In an extended press release published on the same day, Jackson stated that he believed that the video was nothing more than a professional "hit job" on Rob Bliss' behalf. Jackson stated that "our opinion became clear: Rob Bliss, and a partner, both from Los Angeles, are professional agitators who saw an opportunity to exploit Harrison. After posting his highly edited videos, he immediately starts a GoFundMe page where he collects thousands of dollars in donations, in addition to the money he is paid by YouTube and other social media for views." The GoFundMe page in question was started to help Bliss amass legal funds to protect "both the video and (Bliss)" from legal action.

See also 

 10 Hours of Walking in NYC as a Woman

References

External links 

 Watch "Holding a Black Lives Matter Sign in America's Most Racist Town" on YouTube

History of racism in Arkansas
Anti-black racism in the United States
Black Lives Matter
2020 YouTube videos
Harrison, Arkansas
Black Lives Matter art
Documentary films about racism in the United States
Films shot in Arkansas
George Floyd protests in the United States